Gerrod Dewayne Henderson (born October 30, 1978) is a retired American professional basketball player who last played for Mersin BB of the Turkish Basketball League.

He played for Panionios, Hemofarm, Crvena zvezda, Anwil Włocławek, Azovmash Mariupol and Erdemirspor.

References

External links
TBLStat.net Profile

1978 births
Living people
ABA League players
African-American basketball players
American expatriate basketball people in Greece
American expatriate basketball people in Israel
American expatriate basketball people in Poland
American expatriate basketball people in Serbia
American expatriate basketball people in Turkey
American expatriate basketball people in Ukraine
Antalya Büyükşehir Belediyesi players
Basketball players from Louisiana
BC Budivelnyk players
BC Politekhnika-Halychyna players
KK Crvena zvezda players
KK Hemofarm players
KK Włocławek players
Louisiana Tech Bulldogs basketball players
Mersin Büyükşehir Belediyesi S.K. players
Panionios B.C. players
People from Haynesville, Louisiana
Shooting guards
American men's basketball players
21st-century African-American sportspeople
20th-century African-American sportspeople